The 2002 London Broncos season was the twenty-third in the club's history and their seventh season in the Super League. The club was coached by Tony Rea, competing in Super League VII and finishing in 8th place. The club also got to the fifth round of the Challenge Cup.

2002 London Broncos squad

Sources: London Broncos

Super League VII table

2002 Challenge Cup
For the third consecutive year, the Broncos were knocked out of the cup at the fifth round stage.

References

External links
London Broncos - Rugby League Project

London Broncos seasons
London Broncos